GNNradio (Good News Network) is a network of Christian radio stations in the Southeastern United States, broadcasting Christian talk and teaching programs as well as Christian music.

Programs heard on Good News Network include Grace to You with John MacArthur, In Touch with Charles Stanley, Thru the Bible with J. Vernon McGee, Love Worth Finding with Adrian Rogers, Turning Point with David Jeremiah, Running to Win with Erwin Lutzer, Focus on the Family, and Unshackled!

Stations
The Good News Network is heard on 18 full-powered stations in Georgia, Alabama, South Carolina, and North Carolina, as well as 4 low-powered translators.

Full-powered stations

Translators

The Good News Network in Spanish
The Good News network also operates three full-powered Spanish language Christian stations, as well as three low-powered translators.

References

External links
GNN Radio's official website

Christian radio stations in the United States
American radio networks
Religious mass media in the United States
Christian radio stations in Georgia (U.S. state)